Swan Hill railway station is located on the Piangil line in Victoria, Australia. It serves the town of Swan Hill, and it opened on 30 May 1890.

The station serves as the current terminus for V/Line's Swan Hill line services. Beyond the station, Pacific National and Southern Shorthaul Railroad grain trains continue to the line's terminus at Piangil. A goods shed and silos exist near the station.

A 70 ft. turntable was provided at the station in 1940, replacing a 50 ft. turntable. The turntable was removed by September 1969.

Demolished station Lake Boga was located between Swan Hill and Kerang.

Platforms and services

Swan Hill station has one platform. It is serviced by V/Line Swan Hill line services.

Platform 1:
 services to and from Southern Cross

Transport links

V/Line operates a road coach service from Bendigo to Mildura via Swan Hill station.

References

External links
Victorian Railway Stations gallery
Melway map at street-directory.com.au

Railway stations in Australia opened in 1890
Regional railway stations in Victoria (Australia)
Swan Hill